Tjoe de Paula (born 15 February 1982) is a Dutch-Dominican retired basketball player. Standing at 1.85 m (6 ft 1 in), de Paula played as shooting guard.

Professional career
De Paula started his professional career with Noordkop Den Helder in 2001. 

In 2010, De Paula signed with Aris Leeuwarden, where he would play for five seasons. In the 2014–15 season, he averaged 17 points per game. On 1 February 2015, De Paula scored a career-high 30 points in a 87–73 win against Rotterdam.

On 30 July 2017, De Paula signed with Den Helder Suns, newcomer in the Dutch Basketball League (DBL). After the 2017–18 season, De Paula retired. His jersey number 5 was retired by Den Helder.

References

External links
Profile at Eurobasket.com

1982 births
Living people
Aris Leeuwarden players
Almere Pioneers players
BV Den Helder players
Dominican Republic men's basketball players
Dutch Basketball League players
Dutch men's basketball players
Donar (basketball club) players
Shooting guards
Sportspeople from Santo Domingo
Den Helder Suns players